The 1983 Cork Intermediate Hurling Championship was the 74th staging of the Cork Intermediate Hurling Championship since its establishment by the Cork County Board in 1909. The draw for the opening round fixtures took place on 30 January 1983. The championship began on 8 May 1983 and ended on 23 October 1983.

On 23 October 1983, Cloughduv won the championship following a 1-14 to 1-06 defeat of Ballinhassig in the final at Ballinora Sportsfield. This as their fourth championship title overall and their first title since 1973.

Éire Óg's Denis Desmond was the championship's top scorer with 0-28.

Results

First round

Second round

Quarter-finals

Semi-finals

Final

Championship statistics

Top scorers

Overall

In a single game

References

Cork Intermediate Hurling Championship
Cork Intermediate Hurling Championship